Thomas Wimmer may refer to:

 Thomas Wimmer (politician) (1887–1964), mayor of Munich in the 1950s
 Thomas Wimmer (musician), Austrian viola-da-gamba player and conductor